Taphan Hin is a district (amphoe) in the central part of Phichit province, central Thailand.

Geography
Neighboring districts are (from the east clockwise) Thap Khlo, Bang Mun Nak, Pho Thale, Bueng Na Rang, Pho Prathap Chang, Mueang Pichit and  Wang Sai Phun of Phichit Province.

Taphan Hin is located on the eastern side of the Nan River, about 28 km  (about 17 mi) south of Mueang Pichit.

History
The minor district (king amphoe) Taphan Hin was created in 1937 as a subordinate of Mueang Phichit District by putting together the sub-districts Huai Ket from Mueang District, Thap Khlo and Khlong Khun from Bang Mun Nak District, and Wang Samrong from Pho Thale District. It was upgraded to a full district in 1940.

The name "Taphan Hin" means "bridge stone". Because the northern area of market is about 1 km (0.621 mi) away from the center of district, there is a bedrock pushes out into the river like a bridge.

Administration
The district is divided into 13 sub-districts (tambon), which are further subdivided into 97 villages (muban). The town (thesaban mueang) Taphan Hin covers the whole tambon Taphan Hin. There are a further 13 tambon administrative organizations (TAO).

Transportation
Taphan Hin is regarded as one of the three districts of Phichit, with a railroad running through (northern line). The district is served by the Taphan Hin railway station of the State Railway of Thailand (SRT).

References

External links
amphoe.com (Thai)

Taphan Hin
1937 establishments in Siam